Hit Kaji Gurung is a Nepalese politician, belonging to the Communist Party of Nepal (Unified Marxist-Leninist). In the 1999 parliamentary election he was elected from the Syangja-1 constituency, winning 22733 votes.

In the 2008 Constituent Assembly election he was elected from the Syangja-1 constituency, winning 18101 votes.

References

Communist Party of Nepal (Unified Marxist–Leninist) politicians
Living people
Year of birth missing (living people)
Nepal MPs 1999–2002
Gurung people

Members of the 1st Nepalese Constituent Assembly